The  is an electric multiple unit (EMU) train type operated by the private railway operator Seibu Railway mainly on Seibu Chichibu Line services in Saitama Prefecture, Japan since 1988.

Design
The 4000 series trains were built between 1988 and 1992 by combining electrical equipment from former 101 series EMUs with new steel bodies. The trains are finished in a livery of ivory white with blue, red, and green stripes along the waist line, the team colours of the Saitama Seibu Lions baseball team. The driving cabs have a similar configuration to the earlier 101 series and 2000 series EMUs, with a left-hand master controller and right-hand brake control.

Operations

Fleet
, the fleet consists of twelve four-car sets, numbered 4001 to 4023, based at Musashigaoka depot.

Formations
Sets are formed as shown below with two motored ("M") cars and two non-powered driving trailer ("Tc") cars, and the Tc1 car at the southern (Ikebukuro) end.

The M1 car is fitted with two single-arm pantographs (originally lozenge-type pantographs).

Interior
Seating mainly consists of fixed 4-person facing seating bays, with longitudinal bench seating next to the doorways. The Tc1 car has a toilet.

History
The first train entered service in 1988, with twelve four-car sets built by 1992. The fleet was refurbished in 2002 for use on wanman driver only operation services on the Seibu Chichibu Line. Modifications included the addition of automatic passenger announcements.

Fifty-two Seats of Happiness

The interior and exterior design of the train was overseen by architect Kengo Kuma.

The automated on-board passenger announcements in Japanese use the voice of TV presenter , and the melody chimes accompanying the announcements were created by musician Minoru Mukaiya, who was formerly the keyboard player in the group Casiopea.

The train is formed as shown below, with car 1 at the Tokyo (southern) end.

Special liveries
From 16 January 2016, set 4015 received a special Hello Kitty livery as part of a campaign to promote tourism to the Chichibu area. It is scheduled to operate in this livery until 27 March 2016.

References

External links

 Seibu 4000 series train information 
 Fifty-two Seats of Happiness train information 

Electric multiple units of Japan
4000 series
Train-related introductions in 1988
1500 V DC multiple units of Japan
Tokyu Car multiple units